The Toast of New York is a 1937 American biopic directed by Rowland V. Lee and starring Edward Arnold, Cary Grant, Frances Farmer, and Jack Oakie. The film is a fictionalized account of the lives of financiers James Fisk and Edward S. Stokes. The screenplay was based on the book The Book of Daniel Drew by Bouck White and the story "Robber Barons" by Matthew Josephson.

Plot
In post-Civil War America, unscrupulous, ambitious partners Jim Fisk (Arnold) and Nick Boyd (Grant) talk tight-fisted businessman Daniel Drew (Donald Meek) into selling them his shipping company, paying with worthless Confederate bonds. Later, worried that his longtime rival, Cornelius Vanderbilt (Clarence Kolb), is trying to take control of his railroad, Drew seeks help from Fisk, only to have him turn the situation to his own advantage. Fisk and Boyd eventually become powers to be reckoned with on Wall Street.

Meanwhile, both men fall in love with entertainer Josie Mansfield (Farmer). Mansfield agrees to marry Fisk out of gratitude, but really loves Boyd.

Fisk's greed grows beyond all reason and he tries to corner the market in gold. When Fisk ignores Boyd's warnings, Boyd turns against him, worried that the resulting panic threatens the financial system of the whole country. The federal government finally intervenes by releasing its gold reserves, bankrupting Fisk in the process.

Cast and characters

Edward Arnold as Jim Fisk
Cary Grant as Nick Boyd
Frances Farmer as Josie Mansfield
Jack Oakie as Luke
Donald Meek as Daniel Drew
Thelma Leeds as Fleurique
Clarence Kolb as Vanderbilt
Billy Gilbert as Photographer

George Irving as Broker
Russell Hicks as Lawyer
Dudley Clements as Collins
Lionel Belmore as President of Board
James Finlayson - uncredited
Robert McClung as Bellhop
Robert Dudley as Janitor
Dewey Robinson as Beef Dooley

Stanley Fields as Top Sergeant

Production
The film was originally announced as The Robber Barons to star Robert Donat who had just made Count of Monte Cristo for producer Edward Small.

Filming was meant to take four weeks but ended up taking fifteen with Arnold on $10,000 a week, half of which went to B. P. Schulberg who owned his contract. Costing Small this much money gave satisfaction to Arnold, who had been rejected by the producer seeking his representation as an agent in 1918. Costs blew out on the production and there ended up being at least seven writers on the script.

Reception
Reviews were mixed. Frank S. Nugent wrote that it was "only moderately entertaining" and "a familiar formula Arnold show." Variety called it "good entertainment despite its inanities, extravagances and exaggerations." Harrison's Reports wrote that it was "lacking in dramatic force" and had unsympathetic characters but offered "several thrilling moments." Russell Maloney of The New Yorker called the story "fumbling and aimless" and found "shocking anachronisms" in the dialogue, concluding, "Not recommended."

The film was a commercial disappointment, losing $530,000, making it RKO's biggest money loser of the year. This led to Edward Small leaving RKO and returning to United Artists.

References

External links

1937 films
American biographical films
American business films
American black-and-white films
1930s English-language films
Films set in New York City
Films set in the 1860s
Films directed by Rowland V. Lee
Films with screenplays by Dudley Nichols
Films produced by Edward Small
1930s business films
Films scored by Nathaniel Shilkret
1930s biographical films
1930s American films